Paul Mercier (born July 13, 1962) is an American actor and voice actor. He is best known for voicing Leon S. Kennedy in Resident Evil 4 and Specter in the SOCOM U.S. Navy SEALs video game series.

Career
A third-generation stage actor, Mercier made his feature-film debut in Wrestling with God. When he was six years old he took his first bow on stage with his father's community theater group, The Kensington-Garrett Players in Maryland. It wasn't until his senior year in high school, though, while playing Tevye in Fiddler on the Roof that he concluded that acting was his true vocation.

Following professional engagements with a touring company and several other theaters in the Washington D.C. area, he was accepted into the acting program at Adelphi University in 1980. After winning the Alexander-Barnes Acting Competition he was awarded a full scholarship for each of his four years.

Even as a freshman Mercier performed on the Senior Mainstage in plays ranging from Rodgers and Hammerstein to Shakespeare. His repertoire included French mime, dramatic verse, musicals, contemporary comedy, straight plays and cabaret.

Mercier trained for three years at the Royal Shakespeare Company at The Guildhall School of Music and Drama in Central London under the tutelage of Cicely Berry, Patsy Rodenberg, Sue Lefton and other stellar lights of the British stage. A highlight was being selected to perform in the British premiere of Leonard Bernstein's Mass under Bernstein's direction.

Before leaving Great Britain, Mercier had performed professionally with the Royal Shakespeare Company, appeared as "Mercutio" at the Arundel Festival and throughout Europe on an Arts Council Tour, led an English cast through the premiere of Yuri Trifonov's The Exchange outside what was then the Iron Curtain, and directed Insignificance for the Edinburgh Festival.

Mercier returned to the United States and began teaching acting, improvisation, stage combat and verse. Mercier's wife Paula Tiso is credited with bringing him to California where he quickly gained his Screen Actors Guild credentials. In addition to his classical and dramatic endeavors, Mercier is in great demand for voice-overs and is part of a comedy troupe that performs regularly at Los Angeles night spots.

Roles

Animation
 The Legend of Prince Valiant
 The Real Adventures of Jonny Quest – Diver #2 / Technician
 What a Cartoon! – Dad / Talking Dog

Anime
 .hack//SIGN – Bear
 Burn Up Excess – Chiimama
 Ghost in the Shell: Stand Alone Complex – Fake Laughing Man / additional voices
 Vampire Princess Miyu – Genji / Old Man / Village Chief

Films
 Call of Duty: Operation Kingfish – Sergeant Derek "Frost" Westbrook (uncredited)
 Growing Up Tiny: Kenadie's Next Chapter – Narrator
 Resident Evil: Degeneration – Leon S. Kennedy
 Wrestling with God – Alexander Campbell

Live action television
FBI: The Untold Stories
Nazi Hunters – Narrator
Who's the Boss? – Announcer

Video games
 .hack//Mutation – Bear
 .hack//Outbreak – Bear
 .hack//Quarantine – Bear
 Ace Combat: Assault Horizon – Lieutenant Colonel William Bishop
 Age of Conan: Rise of the Godslayer – General Sheng
 Call of Duty: World at War – Private Miller
 Call of Duty: Advance Warfare – Additional Voices
 Command & Conquer: Generals
 Command & Conquer: Generals – Zero Hour
 God of War II – Translator 2
 Infamous 2 – Cops / Militia / Rebels
 Infamous 2: Festival of Blood – Male Pedestrians
 Onimusha 3: Demon Siege – Jacques Blanc
 Metal Gear Solid: Portable Ops – USSR Soldier A
 Nox – Quartermaster / Aidan / Henrick / Necromancer 2 / Mineworker 5
 No More Heroes III – Black Night Direction / Paradox Bandit
 Prince of Persia – Additional voices
 Resident Evil 4 – Leon S. Kennedy / Merchant
 Resident Evil: The Darkside Chronicles – Leon S. Kennedy
 Resistance: Fall of Man
 Saints Row: The Third – Additional voices
 Saints Row IV – The Voices of Virtual Steelport
 Shadows of the Damned – Fleming / Demons
 Shout About TV – Voice-over
 SOCOM II U.S. Navy SEALs – Specter
 SOCOM 3 U.S. Navy SEALs – Specter
 SOCOM U.S. Navy SEALs: Combined Assault – Specter
 SOCOM U.S. Navy SEALs: Confrontation – U.S. Navy SEAL 3
 Star Trek: Starfleet Command III – Federation Officer #2
 Starhawk – Rifters
 Skylanders: Swap Force
 The Lord of the Rings: Conquest – Faramir / Evil Human Officer #3 / Gondorian Officer #3
 The Lord of the Rings: The Battle for Middle-Earth – Uruk-hai
 The Lord of the Rings: The Battle for Middle-Earth II – Uruk-hai
 The Lord of the Rings: The War of the Ring
 The Rise of the Argonauts
 Transformers: Dark of the Moon – Additional voices

References

External links

https://web.archive.org/web/20090906140443/http://www.residentevil.com.br/entrevista_mercier/index_english.php

1962 births
Living people
American film directors
American male video game actors
American male voice actors
Place of birth missing (living people)
20th-century American male actors
21st-century American male actors